Mamoudou Kondo (born 30 November 1990 in Mali) is a Malian footballer. He currently plays for the Saudi Pro League side Al-Shoalah.

Honours
Stade Malien
Première Division:
2011

External links
Eurosport.com Profile
Football.com Profile

FootMercato.net 
Saudi League Statistics Profile
SoccerPunter

1989 births
Malian footballers
Living people
Malian expatriate footballers
Malian expatriate sportspeople in Saudi Arabia
Stade Malien players
Al-Shoulla FC players
Association football defenders
21st-century Malian people